A bookmaker (often abbreviated "bookie") is a person or organization that calculates odds and accepts and pays off bets.

Bookmaker may also refer to:

 Printer (publishing)

See also
 Book (disambiguation)
 Bookbinder, someone who physically assembles a book from an ordered stack of paper sheets
 Bookie (disambiguation)
 Editor, of books
 Publisher